Caloptilia vibrans is a moth of the family Gracillariidae. It is known from South Africa.

The larvae feed on Clerodendron glabrum. They mine the leaves of their host plant. The mine has the form of a narrow, very oblong, transparent or semi-transparent mine, either along midrib and veins or along edge of leaf.

References

Endemic moths of South Africa
vibrans
Moths of Africa
Moths described in 1918